French South Korean or South Korean French may refer to:
French people in South Korea
South Koreans in France
France–South Korea relations
Multiracial people of French and South Korean descent